A geographic number is a telephone number, from a range of numbers in the United Kingdom National Telephone Numbering Plan, where part of its digit structure contains geographic significance used for routing calls to the physical location of the network termination point of the subscriber to whom the telephone number has been assigned, or where the network termination point does not relate to the geographic area code but where the tariffing remains consistent with that geographic area code.

In the Netherlands any telephone number consists of 10 digits and the geographic number is often separated with a minus sign. The number 0592 for example is the geographic number for the area in and around the city Assen, and Groningen uses 050. Someone living in Assen has a caller ID of 6 numbers and someone in Groningen has a caller ID of 7 numbers.

See also
Telephone number
Telephone numbering plan
List of country calling codes
Caller id

Telephone numbers
Identifiers